Jesse Lawrence Barnes (August 26, 1892 – September 9, 1961) was an American pitcher in Major League Baseball.

Barnes began his major league career in 1914 with the Boston Braves. In 1917, he led the National League with 21 losses. On October 2, 1917, he became the only NL pitcher to walk twice in one inning.

In 1918, Barnes was traded to the New York Giants. He had three very good years with the Giants. On the last day of the 1919 season, Barnes won his National League-leading 25th victory, 6–1, over Lee Meadows and the Philadelphia Phillies at Polo Grounds. The game was played at a feverish pace and lasted a mere 51 minutes, a major league record that still stands as the shortest nine-inning game ever played.

In 1920 he had 20 wins, following with 15 wins in 1921 and two victories in the 1921 World Series against the New York Yankees. Then, on May 7, 1922, he hurled a no-hitter against the Phillies; Cy Williams was the only baserunner, who walked and was erased on a double play.

Barnes returned to the Braves in 1923, playing for them three years before joining the Brooklyn Robins during 1926 and 1927. For the second time, he led the league in losses (20) in 1924.

His younger brother, Virgil, also pitched in the majors, and both were teammates with the Giants from 1919 to 1923.

On June 26, 1924, Jesse opposed Virgil in the first pitching matchup of brothers in major league history. Virgil did not have a decision while Jesse was credited with the loss as the Giants defeated the Braves‚ 8–1. The Barnes brothers would match up four more times during their careers.

Barnes was a better than average hitting pitcher in his major league career, posting a .214 batting average (195-for-913) with 71 runs, 5 triples, 1 home run, 69 RBI, and 24 bases on balls. In four World Series appearances, he batted .308 (4-for-13) with three runs scored. Defensively, he was better than average, recording a .976 fielding percentage which was 17 points higher than the league average at his position.

The baseball author and analyst Bill James is also a distant relative of the brothers.

See also
 List of Major League Baseball annual wins leaders
 List of Major League Baseball no-hitters

References

External links

Major League Baseball pitchers
Boston Braves players
New York Giants (NL) players
Brooklyn Robins players
National League wins champions
Keokuk Indians players
Davenport Blue Sox players
Toledo Mud Hens players
Buffalo Bisons (minor league) players
Baseball players from Oklahoma
People from Perkins, Oklahoma
1892 births
1961 deaths